The 1957 Star World Championship was held in Havana, Cuba in 1957.

Results

References

Star World Championships
1957 in sailing
Sailing competitions in Cuba
1957 in Cuban sport